Chaybasar may refer to:
 Chaybasar, Armenia
Chaybasar-e Jonubi Rural District
Chaybasar-e Sharqi Rural District
Chaybasar-e Shomali Rural District